Mor Philoxenos Yuhanon (born John Jacob Elappanal; 5 December 1941 – 30 December 2015) was a Syriac Orthodox bishop. He was the Bishop Emeritus of Malabar Diocese.

Early years
John Jacob was born to the Elappanal Family of Pampady on 5 December 1941. In 1964, at the age of 23, he was ordained deacon by Mor Philaxinos Poulose (then Catholicose Mor Baselios Paulose II) during his rebellious Antiochian Movement, and Kassisho in 1969 by Mor Baselios Augen I.

Education 

Jacob had his primary and high school education at Pampady. Later, he joined Baselios College (Kottayam) where he received a BA in economics. After that he obtained an MA in economics from Sri Venkateswara University (Thirupathi). His basic theological training was at the Orthodox Theological Seminary in Kottayam. Mor Athanasius Yeshue Samuel, Archbishop of Canada, sponsored Jacob for his higher studies in the United States. Jacob joined the New York Theological Seminary and obtained his STM degree. Subsequently, he took his Th.D. degree from Logos Graduate School of Theology in New York City and DD degree from Orlando International Seminary in Florida. Mor Philoxenos is the only bishop in Malankara Jacobite Syrian Church with two doctorates. He also completed a Clinical Pastoral Education in New York. After becoming a bishop, Mor Philoxenos continued studying and joined Dakshina Bharat Hindi Prachar Sabha, a deemed university and center of excellence under Govt. of India, and secured Hindi Bhooshan and Hindi Praveen.

As priest 
When Jacob was studying in the USA, he served as the vicar in many Jacobite churches in Staten Island, Manhattan, Philadelphia, Chicago, Dallas, Houston and Augusta. He also performed volunteer work for the Holy Jacobite Syrian Orthodox Church.

As metropolitan 

After 17 January 1985, when the Metropolitan of Malabar Diocese, Samuel Mor Philaxinos, died, the Holy Episcopal Synod selected Jacob as the new metropolitan to the diocese. On 12 September 1985 Mor Baselios Paulose II consecrated Jacob as the new metropolitan of Malabar, with the name Mor Philoxenos, at St Peter's & St Paul's Jacobite Syrian Orthodox Cathedral in Meenangadi (one of the biggest churches in Malankara).

The history of the Malabar Diocese is closely related to Yuhanon Mor Philexinos. When Yuhanon Mor Philoxenos took charge of Malabar, the Diocese area was in a high state of deterioration. He therefore co-ordinated the works in the diocese and constructed many new churches throughout the diocese. A lot of them are built in Nilgiri District of Tamil Nadu, Kozhikode and Malappuram Districts of Kerala.

Mor Philoxenos Yuhanon started institutions including:

Mor Alias Snehabhavan
Mor Philoxenos Memorial Press
Mor Gregorios Teachers Training College
St. Peter's & St. Paul's EHS School
Aramana Chapel
Mor Basil Day Care
Mor Philoxenos Foundation
The present Bishop's Palace

See also

Syriac Orthodox Church
Jacobite Syrian Christian Church

References

External links
 syriacchristianity.org
 viswasasamrakshakan.org

Syriac Orthodox Church bishops
Indian Oriental Orthodox Christians
1941 births
2015 deaths
Sri Venkateswara University alumni
Christian clergy from Kottayam